Tarucus ungemachi, the Ungemach's Pierrot, is a butterfly in the family Lycaenidae. It is found in Senegal, the Gambia, Guinea, Burkina Faso, northern Ghana, northern Nigeria, northern Cameroon, Chad, southern Sudan, Ethiopia, northern Uganda and northwestern Kenya. The habitat consists of savanna, including Sudan savanna and Guinea savanna.

Adults typically feed from the flowers of Ziziphus, Tridax and other species.

The larvae feed on Ziziphus abyssinica.

References

Butterflies described in 1942
Tarucus